Karpeles is a Jewish surname, and may refer to:
 Eliezer Karpeles (1754, Prague – 1832, Lieben), Bohemian rabbi
 Leopold Karpeles (1838, Prague – 1909)
 Gustav Karpeles (1848, Ivanovice na Hané – 1909), Jewish Bohemian literary historian, publicist and writer
 Alfred Klaar, born: Aaron Karpeles (1848, Prague – 1927), Jewish (Catholic) Bohemian literary historian, journalist and writer
  (1868, Vienna – 1938, Vienna), Jewish Austrian politician, publicist and editor
 Georges Kars, born: Jiří Karpeles (1882, Kralupy – 1945), Jewish-Bohemian painter and artist
 Maud Karpeles (1885, London – 1976)
 Suzanne Karpelès, (1890, Paris – 1968, Pondicherry), Jewish-French Indologist, first curator of the Royal Library of Phnom Penh, Cambodia.
 Mark Karpelès (1985–), CEO of Bitcoin exchange Mt. Gox
Karpeles Manuscript Library Museum, founded by David Karpeles and

References

Jewish surnames
Germanic-language surnames
Surnames of Czech origin